Claesson is a surname. Notable people with the surname include: 

Åke Claesson (1889–1967), Swedish film actor
Emma Claesson (born 1977), Swedish orienteering competitor 
Fredrik Claesson (born 1992), Swedish ice hockey player
Johan Claesson (born 1981), Swedish footballer
Leif Claesson (photographer) (born 1959), Swedish photographer and actor
Mattias Claesson (born 1986), Swedish middle-distance runner
Michael Claesson (born 1965), Swedish Army officer
Stig Claesson (1928–2008), Swedish writer, visual artist, and illustrator
Viktor Claesson (born 1992), Swedish footballer

See also
Claesson Koivisto Rune, Swedish multidisciplinary design/architecture office based in Stockholm, Sweden